North Park Nature Reserve is a protected area along the banks of the Umhlatuzana River, near Queensburgh in KwaZulu-Natal, South Africa.  The park was proclaimed in 1968 and is managed by Ezemvelo KZN Wildlife.

Flora and fauna

The reserve protects riverine and coastal scarp forest, and is known for its birdlife and butterflies.  There are a recorded 102 tree species in the reserve, with 48 considered rare. Close to 160 bird species have been recorded, including the Knysna Turaco and Purple Crested Turaco.

A number of small mammals can be found in the reserve, including blue and grey duiker, mongoose, hyrax and cane rats.

References 

Nature reserves in South Africa